Sharpe's Regiment is a British television drama, the ninth of a series that follows the career of Richard Sharpe, a British soldier during the Napoleonic Wars. This episode is based on the 1986 novel of the same name by Bernard Cornwell.

Plot

It is 1813. The First Battalion of the South Essex Regiment has suffered terrible losses in the fighting in Spain and the entire regiment is in danger of being disbanded as a result. Major Sharpe (Sean Bean) and Sergeant Major Harper (Daragh O'Malley) are sent back to England to find out why replacements have not been sent. Sharpe is told that the Second Battalion of the South Essex is drawing pay for over 700 soldiers, but when he arrives at the Second Battalion's barracks, he finds only eleven men, even though there is regular recruiting for the regiment. Sharpe is determined to get to the bottom of things.

During an audience with the dimwitted Prince Regent (Julian Fellowes), Sharpe is introduced to Lord Fenner (Nicholas Farrell), the man responsible for the regiment's troubles. Fenner insists that the Second Battalion exists only on paper as a means of paying troops who have been scattered for various reasons until they can be placed into a proper unit. Fenner sends Lady Anne Camoynes (Caroline Langrishe) to sleep with Sharpe and ascertain his intentions. When he finds out, he sends assassins to solve his potential problem, but Sharpe and Harper dispose of them instead. Their bodies are tossed into a river, and Sharpe sees to it that rumours are spread that it was he and Harper who have been killed.

Meanwhile, the two men "enlist" in the Second Battalion to find out what happens to the recruits. They are trained by the brutal and effete Lieutenant Colonel Girdwood (Mark Lambert) and then auctioned off to other regiments by Sharpe's old enemy, Sir Henry Simmerson (Michael Cochrane), with Fenner getting a kickback. Simmerson's niece, Jane Gibbons (Abigail Cruttenden), helps Sharpe and Harper escape afterwards.

Sharpe goes to Horse Guards to see the Commander-in-Chief of the Army, the Duke of York, but learns that the Duke is not in London. Sharpe sees his old friend, Sir William Lawford, in whom he confides. Lawford, on his own initiative, approaches Fenner and proposes a solution—the South Essex gets its men and Sharpe is given command of a rifle battalion and sent to North America. Lady Camoynes overhears and contacts Sharpe. She tells him that he needs proof of the sales and tells him that she wants to ruin Fenner, who gets sexual favors from her as a way of paying off the debts of her late husband, whom Fenner ruined.

Sharpe and Harper return to Girdwood's training camp and take over, placing Girdwood under arrest, but they are unable to find any paperwork documenting the sales. Sharpe instructs Harper to complete the necessary paperwork, officially making the recruits part of the South Essex.

Girdwood escapes and goes to Simmerson's estate, where he collects the incriminating paperwork, and then heads to Simmerson's London house. Sharpe arrives at Simmerson's house too late to stop Girdwood, but he sees an invitation to a party hosted by the Prince Regent. Sharpe also learns from Jane that Simmerson regularly beats her (her father was a lowly saddler), and Sharpe rashly proposes marriage as a way of enabling her to escape Simmerson's abuse. Jane agrees to try to steal the paperwork from Simmerson's house. Sharpe forms up the recruits of the Second Battalion and takes them to London, where they march in on the Prince Regent's party, with Sharpe bearing the eagle he took at Talavera. The Prince gleefully claims them as his own, making the regiment the Prince of Wales' Own Volunteers, instead of the South Essex.

Sharpe confronts Lord Fenner, but does not have any proof, as Simmerson gave the paperwork to Fenner, who ordered it burnt. Just in time, Lady Camoynes shows up with ledgers—which she saved from the fire—detailing the crimes and uses them for blackmail for herself and for Sharpe. Simmerson, due to his influential friends, once more escapes prosecution. To shelter Jane from Simmerson's wrath, Sharpe becomes engaged to her.

Thanks to Lady Camoyne's blackmail of Fenner, Sharpe gets the men he came for and goes back to fight in Spain, saving the regiment from being deleted from the army list. The regiment is now under the command of Colonel Girdwood, which Sharpe also specifically requested. In Spain, Girdwood has a close encounter with a French artillery round during an attack on the French border and suffers a mental breakdown as a result. He is invalided home, and Sharpe takes command of the Prince of Wales' Own Volunteers, leading them on to victory.

Cast

 Sean Bean as Major Richard Sharpe
 Daragh O'Malley as Sergeant Major Patrick Harper
 Abigail Cruttenden as Jane Gibbons
 Michael Cochrane as Sir Henry Simmerson
 Nicholas Farrell as Lord Fenner
 Caroline Langrishe as Lady Anne Camonynes
 James Laurenson as Major General Ross
 Mark Lambert as Lieutenant Colonel Bartholomew Girdwood
 Julian Fellowes as the Prince Regent
 Norman Rossington as Sergeant Horatio Havercamp
 Benedict Taylor as Sir William Lawford
 John Savident as Major General Sir Barstan Maxwell
 John Tams as Rifleman Daniel Hagman
 Jason Salkey as Rifleman Harris
 Robert Patterson as Sergeant Lynch
 Julie T. Wallace as Maggie
 Alexander Armstrong as Rossendale
 Adam James as Captain Carline

Soundtrack
 "The Bold Fusilier" (a.k.a. "Marching through Rochester")

References

External links
 
 Sharpe's Regiment at SharpeFilm.com

1996 British television episodes
1990s historical films
1990s war films
Films based on British novels
Films based on historical novels
Films based on military novels
Napoleonic Wars films
Regiment
Cultural depictions of George IV
War television films
Fiction set in 1813
Films directed by Tom Clegg (director)